Parmouti 5 - Coptic Calendar - Parmouti 7

The sixth day of the Coptic month of Parmouti, the eighth month of the Coptic year. In common years, this day corresponds to April 1, of the Julian Calendar, and April 14, of the Gregorian Calendar. This day falls in the Coptic Season of Shemu, the season of the Harvest.

Commemorations

Saints 

 The departure of Saint Mary of Egypt, the Anchorite 
 Departure of St. Abdel Messih El-Makari

Other commemorations 

 Annual commemoration of the Appearance of the Lord to Thomas the Apostle after His Resurrection

References 

Days of the Coptic calendar